Ramadhan Haji Saleh (born 9 January 1972) is a Tanzanian CCM politician and Member of Parliament for Bumbwini constituency since 2010.

References

1972 births
Living people
Chama Cha Mapinduzi MPs
Tanzanian MPs 2010–2015